Porfirio López Meza (born September 10, 1985 in San José, Costa Rica) is a Costa Rican professional football player who currently plays for Municipal Perez Zeledon in the Costa Rican Premier Division.

Club career
Porfirio López began his career with Santos de Guápiles in Costa Rica, already being part of the first team in the 2003/04 season. He made his debut with the club in 2006 and remained at the club for three seasons. He then joined Puntarenas and quickly established himself as the club's starting left back. He moved to China and signed a contract with Dalian Shide in February 2010. He made his CSL debut for Dalian against Shaanxi Chanba on 28 March and scored a goal in the match.
After one season in China, López went on loan to Costa Rican club Alajuelense, helping his new club win both the Clausura and Apertura titles in 2011.

López signed with Philadelphia Union of Major League Soccer on December 22, 2011.

López was released by Philadelphia on November 19, 2012.

International career
He made his debut for Costa Rica in an August 2011 friendly match against Ecuador and has, as of May 2014, earned a total of 6 caps, scoring no goals. He represented his country in 1 FIFA World Cup qualification match.

Career statistics

Club

Updated June 27, 2012

International

Statistics accurate as of August 16, 2012

References

External links
 

1985 births
Living people
Footballers from San José, Costa Rica
Association football defenders
Costa Rican footballers
Costa Rica international footballers
Santos de Guápiles footballers
Puntarenas F.C. players
Dalian Shide F.C. players
L.D. Alajuelense footballers
Municipal Pérez Zeledón footballers
Philadelphia Union players
Costa Rican expatriate footballers
Expatriate soccer players in the United States
Expatriate footballers in China
Costa Rican expatriate sportspeople in China
Liga FPD players
Chinese Super League players
Major League Soccer players
2014 Copa Centroamericana players
Copa Centroamericana-winning players